Edward Rigby was an actor.

Edward Rigby may also refer to:

Edward Rigby (priest), Archdeacon of Niagara from 1964 to 1973
Edward Rigby (died 1706), MP for Preston
Edward Rigby (physician) (1747–1821), English physician, writer, and local politician
Edward Rigby (obstetrician) (1804–1860), English obstetrician and medical writer